Turbonilla gutierrezi is a species of sea snail, a marine gastropod mollusk in the family Pyramidellidae, the pyrams and their allies.

Description
The shell grows to  a length of 4.3 mm.

Distribution
This marine species occurs off New Caledonia.

References

External links
 To Encyclopedia of Life
 To World Register of Marine Species

gutierrezi
Gastropods described in 2010